In traditional Persian architecture, a howz is a centrally positioned symmetrical axis pool. If in a traditional house or private courtyard, it is used for bathing, aesthetics or both. If in a sahn of a mosque, it is used for performing ablutions. It may be used as a "theatre" for people to sit on all sides of the pool while others entertain.

Howz is a feature of the Persian gardens.

Gallery

See also
 Architecture of Iran
 Shadirvan

References

Mosque architecture
Architecture in Iran
Arabic architecture
Fountains
Islamic gardens
Islamic architectural elements
Persian gardens
Persian words and phrases
Iranian inventions
Passive cooling
Passive ventilation